Fadak (Nezam Abad) Metro Station is a station in Tehran Metro Line 2. It is located in Ayatollah Madani Avenue. It is between Janbazan Metro Station and Sabalan Metro Station.

References

Tehran Metro stations